Achinos is a village and community in the municipal unit of Echinaioi, municipality of Stylida, in Phthiotis, Central Greece. As of the 2011 census, the community had a population of 816, and the village had 726.

The community has several villages other than Achinos (2011 population in parentheses):

Drepano Δρέπανο (2)
Drosia Δροσιά (7)
Kouvela Κουβέλα (65)
Paralia Achinou Παραλία Αχινού (12)
Platanias Πλατανιάς (4)
Skasmada Σκασμάδα (0)

References

Populated places in Phthiotis
Villages in Greece